The false zokor (Myospalax aspalax) is a species of rodent in the family Spalacidae. It is found in Mongolia, China and Russia.

References
 Shar, S. & Lkhagvasuren, D. 2008.  Myospalax aspalax.   2008 IUCN Red List of Threatened Species.   Downloaded on 14 August 2008.

Myospalax
Mammals described in 1776
Taxonomy articles created by Polbot
Rodents of China
Mammals of Mongolia
Mammals of Siberia